The Rambler Tarpon was a concept car, a compact-sized sporty youth-oriented 2+2 hardtop coupé developed in 1963 by American Motors Corporation (AMC). The bright red with black roof design study made its public debut 1964 Chicago Auto Show and served to foretell the fastback design elements of the larger Rambler Marlin that was introduced in 1965.

Design
The Tarpon was an "aquatically named" design study for a small rear-wheel drive two-door monocoque pillarless hardtop. Characteristic was its sleek, sloping fastback roof that narrowed as it met the rear bumper. The Tarpon featured two large and deep taillights that flowed down from the shoulders of the rear fender. The show car was finished in red with a black vinyl roof accenting its clean shape from the windshield back to almost the rear bumper. The smooth roofline was unbroken by the almost horizontal rear window. In a 1991 book about collectible cars, automotive historian Richard M. Langworth described the Tarpon's sweeping roofline and "roughly elliptical side window openings suited the American's handsome lines to a T, and the pretty well-proportioned fastback looked a natural for showroom sale." However, it had no trunk lid or outside hatch to access the cargo area.

The Tarpon concept "generated much excitement at the Society of Automotive Engineers (SAE International) convention in January 1964." The concept was shown with the designers worked on a cutaway profile of the car on stage. The Tarpon then generated wide public interest as it toured the auto show circuit starting in January 1964. Its semi-boat tail roof design was accented with black vinyl first appeared at the Chicago Auto Show. It was well received at the automobile shows before the so-called "pony car" market segment was established. The Tarpon appeared together with the Mustang II (a concept design shown before the production version was unveiled) at the 1964 New York International Auto Show.

Development
The automobile marketplace was changing in the early 1960s "when many young, first-time drivers entered the market ... and bought cars with flair." Early in 1963, American Motors' management began development of “a new car with a sports flair” to modify its image. Dick Teague's styling team devised an entirely new concept for AMC - a fastback design. He had a passion for pre-World War II automobiles and had a "passion for taking old styling and making it new again." He observed the 1963 Chevrolet Corvette spit-window coupe design and the 1963 Ford Galaxie Sports Hardtop, which outsold the notchback models, followed the pattern set by Chevrolet's distinctive 1942 Fleetline two-door fastback body style called the Aerosedan and Nash's own Airflyte. Teague knew that his design team had to work with considerably smaller budgets than their counterparts at Detroit's Big Three (General Motors, Ford, and Chrysler). The small automaker was not willing to undertake the large investment that would be required all-new tooling, so his design team made imaginative use of existing tooling and create spin-offs from existing products.

The Tarpon was made on the compact-sized Rambler American's new design and platform already set for the 1964 model year. The top section of the new Rambler Tarpon was made of reinforced plastic. The windshield was described as "bulbous" and the fastback roofline featuring a "skylight" rear window. The swept back, double-compound curved windshield further enhanced the Tarpon's low appearance. The Tarpon also featured polished 13-inch aluminum wheels. Production Ramblers rode on ordinary steel 14-inch versions, so the smaller wheels made the car lower. The interior had a complete set of dial-type gauges under a padded dash, a deep-dish aluminum steering wheel rimmed in walnut, and custom bucket seats.

The Tarpon seemed to take aim at Plymouth's new Valiant-based Barracuda and the soon to be announced Ford Mustang. Shown before the introduction of Ford's compact Falcon-based Mustang, AMC's Tarpon was "an instant success" with 60% of surveyed potential buyers stating they would buy one.

The Tarpon did not go into production. At that time, AMC was still developing its "GEN-2" light-weight V8 engine that would fit the small Rambler American chassis. If produced, the Tarpon would have been a competitor to the Plymouth Barracuda, a fastback derivative of the second-generation compact Valiant. Utilizing an existing compact platform would have paralleled the Mustang's design approach whose chassis, suspension, and drive train were derived from the Ford Falcon. However, AMC's market research indicated that offering only a six-cylinder power plant would not satisfy the intended target market segment. The new V8 engine was introduced in 1966 in the sporty hardtop model of the Rambler American called Rogue. Moreover, AMC's CEO, Roy Abernethy, wanted the company to move away from the marketing image of Ramblers as being only small, economical, and conservative automobiles and designs. According to Abernethy AMC's "main problem was its image lag — the fact that too many people still thought of American Motors as the builder of plain jane compacts."

Under Abernethy's leadership, the company was introducing larger cars that had more options, prestige, and luxury. For example, the new convertibles and more upscale Ambassador potentially offered higher profits. Although the small four-passenger Tarpon anticipated a new market segment that later became known as the pony cars, the decision at AMC was to build its sporty fastback "image" model on the company's mid-sized or intermediate Classic platform. Teague recalled that "Abernethy had decided that instead of a 2+2 we would build a 3+3 sports-type car." The new production model, called Marlin, was introduced mid-year 1965 and it added more "sport" to AMC's car line-up. However, the Marlin had a six-passenger capacity and was equipped with features as a personal luxury car like the Ford Thunderbird or Buick Riviera, rather than a competitor in the pony-car segment. Nevertheless, the production Marlin incorporated many of the design features that were the trademarks of the Tarpon show car. Because it was a much larger car, the Marlin had more pronounced shoulders extending laterally behind the rear wheels than those on the Tarpon.

In 1965, three years before AMC's production pony car was unveiled, press reports described the compact-sized design as "Tarpon-like fastback" built on the Rambler American's platform. The Tarpon "was the car that AMC could have, should have, but didn’t make in response to the Mustang... Instead AMC built the Marlin, which, on the larger Classic chassis, was too big to be a pony car, too slow to be a muscle car, and cursed with ungainly proportions due to the Classic’s stubby hood." The automaker was niche marketing, offering a larger-sized product that wasn't offered by its much larger competitors. Although the Tarpon show car pointed the way, AMC waited until the 1968 model year to introduce a small fastback, the Javelin, that was aimed directly at the market segment created by Ford's Mustang.

Designers

The design team at AMC was headed by Dick Teague. Stuart Vance was Manager of Engineering and this included the body development, as well as the prototype shop. Others involved with the Tarpon were Teague's right-hand man Fred Hudson (who later contributed to the Javelin), Vince Geraci (who contributed to the final look of the Marlin), Chuck Mashigan (Advanced Studio manager), Robert Nixon, Jack Kenitz, Donald Stumpf, Neil Brown Jr., Bill St. Clair, Jim Pappas, as well as Jim Alexander (who designed the interior). Teague selected the names for both the Tarpon show car and the production Marlin.

Teague worked at AMC for 26 years. He was responsible for some of AMC's timelessly beautiful and advanced vehicles, as well as for some of the company's disappointments. After his retirement as Vice President at AMC, Teague described the development of the fastback design: 

"... We originally had a car called the Tarpon, which should have been produced ... it was really a neat car, a tight little fastback. We showed it to the S.A.E. (Society of Automotive Engineers) convention (February, 1964 in Cobo Hall in Detroit, Michigan) and everybody was steamed up about it! But the thing that killed the Tarpon was the fact that we didn't have a V-8 for it at that time.... [AMC president] Roy Abernethy didn't like little cars. Never did. He liked big cars, because he was a big guy -- hell of a nice guy. And he felt that this car was too small, so he said, "Well, heck, Teague, why don't you just put it on the Rambler Classic wheel-base? That way you've got V-8 availability and you've got more room inside it." And then on top of that he added an inch to the roof while I was in Europe. I still have never gotten over that..."

Teague was also responsible for the design of AMC's compact Javelin, as well as the two-seat AMX.

Legacy
The Tarpon served as the direct fastback design influence for the 1965-1967 AMC Marlin. Moreover, components of the original Tarpon design returned to a production car in 2004 in a fastback coupe with a distinctive design "that reminds more than one observer of the old Rambler Marlin." The principal appearance statements of the small two-seat Chrysler Crossfire include its "provocative boattail theme" in its fastback and rear end design. Automotive journalists noted the Crossfire's resemblance to the AMC Marlin featuring the Tarpon's rear-end. For example, Rob Rothwell wrote: "My first glimpse of the rear lines of the Chrysler Crossfire instantly brought back memories of one of my favorite cars, the 1965 Rambler Marlin"

Notes

References
 American Motors (AMC) Public Relations Department, various press releases.
 American Motors (AMC) Annual Reports.
 
 
 

Tarpon
Tarpon
Rear-wheel-drive vehicles
Coupés
Concept cars
1960s cars